Izmail Oblast (7 August 1940 — 15 February 1954) was an oblast in the Ukrainian SSR, roughly corresponding to the historical region of Budjak.

The oblast was organized on 7 August 1940 on the territory, known as Budjak or southern Bessarabia, occupied by the Soviet Union from Romania. It was originally known as Akkerman Oblast until 1 December 1940, i.e. before the oblast center was moved from Akkerman to Izmail. The oblast was administratively subdivided into 13 raions. On 15 February 1954, the oblast was liquidated, and its territory was included in Odessa Oblast. The current area is now divided into two municipalities (Izmail and Bilhorod-Dnistrovskyi) and nine raions; these cover  and in 2015 had a combined population of 592,842.

See also
Izmail Raion

External links
 Akkerman Oblast (Handbook on history of the Communist Party and the Soviet Union)
 Decree of the Presidium of the Supreme Council of USSR of February 15, 1954 about liquidation of the Izmail Oblast of the Ukrainian SSR. Russian version of the Wikisource.

Bessarabia
History of Odesa Oblast
Former oblasts of Ukraine